Industrial and commercial activities dominate Mangalore's economy. It is the only city in Karnataka to have all modes of transport — air, road, rail and sea. The fastest growing non metro (Indian city of population less than 1 million) in South India is Mangalore. Mangalore is the 2nd largest business centre in Karnataka. Around 75% of India's coffee, timber and cashew nuts exports are handled by the New Mangalore Port. Mangalore is one among the 5 cities in the country to have both a Major Port and an International Airport. Mangalore has some of the tallest buildings in South India, with many more under construction. Mangalore International Airport is among the 2 International Airports in Karnataka, along with Bangalore's Kempegowda International Airport.

Petrochemicals and processing 

BASF, Mangalore Refinery and Petrochemicals Ltd. (MRPL), Mangalore Chemicals and Fertilizers Ltd. (MCF), Kudremukh Iron Ore Company Ltd. (KIOCL)(now closed), Hindustan Petroleum Corporation Limited (HPCL), Bharat Petroleum Corporation Plant (BPCL), Indian Oil Corporation Limited (IOCL), ONGC Mangalore Petrochemicals Limited (OMPL), JBF Petrochemicals and Total Oil are the major petrochemicals and processing industries in Mangalore. One of the largest SEZ in India, the ONGC - Mangalore Special Economic Zone is in Mangalore. MRPL, the only refinery in the state, will soon get a Navaratna status. Mangalore Chemicals & Fertilizers (MCF), the only fertilizer factory in the state, is situated at Baikampady. HPCL has its oil refinery at Mangalore. BPCL has established an LPG plant near the New Mangalore Port. BASF has established a Research and development (R&D) centre at Mangalore.

At the Mangalore Special Economic Zone, in a new 15 million tonne refinery, petrochemical plant and power and LNG plants, The Oil and Natural Gas Corporation (ONGC) plans to invest over Rs. 35,000 crore. Of the country, this will be the first Petroleum, Chemicals, Petrochemicals Investment Region (PCPIR). India has built 5.33 million tons of strategic crude oil storages at Mangalore, Padur (near Udupi) in Karnataka and at Visakhapatnam to ensure energy security. Mitsui, a Japanese conglomerate has planned to set up an LNG terminal in Mangalore.

Logistics and Shipping 
Interlog Services, a French logistics firm has established its office at Mangalore Hills.

The table below lists some of the Logistics and Shipping companies situated in Mangalore.

Ship building 
Bharati Shipyard Ltd (BSL) (now known as Bharati Defence and Infrastructure Limited) has established its ship building site near Tannirbavi in Mangalore. Mangalore is the 6th shipyard established by BSL. Cargo ships are built here which have a maximum length of 120 meters. BSL's subsidiary, Tebma Shipyard Limited has a ship manufacturing site at Malpe, which is 56 km from Mangalore city.

Manufacturing industries 
Sequent Scientific Ltd. is a Pharmaceutical company, and has its manufacturing unit at Baikampady in Mangalore. Syngene International, a contract research arm of Biocon, has set up its manufacturing plant at Mangalore SEZ. Solara, a pharmaceutical company also has its manufacturing unit in Mangalore. Hindustan Unilever has set up a factory in Boloor which produces mainly Rin detergents. Suzlon has established its wind energy generation plant at Padubidri near Mangalore. Suzlon Energy plans to manufacture REpower wind turbines at its plant near Mangalore. Bakery and confectionery industries are also found in Mangalore; Gyp-gyp-gy and Narans are a few among them. Primacy Industries Ltd. in Mangalore manufactures scented candles and exports them to Europe, United States and the Middle-East. Catasynth Speciality Chemicals, a manufacturing facility of Anthea Group has its office in Mangalore.

Banking and Finance 

Four of the twenty banks nationalized during the first half of the 20th century were established in Mangalore.

Karnataka Bank Limited was established on 18 February 1924 in Mangalore. In addition to these, two banks were established in nearby towns. Corporation Bank was founded in Udupi by Khan Bahadur Haji Abdulla Haji Kasim Saheb Bahadur in 1906, and Syndicate Bank was co-founded in Manipal by T M A Pai, Upendra Ananth Pai and V S Kudva in 1925. While Karnataka Bank Limited is still headquartered in Mangalore, Canara Bank is headquartered in Bangalore.

The Mangalore Stock Exchange (MgSE) was incorporated on 31 July 1984 as a public limited company. The company was granted recognition as a stock exchange on 9 September 1985. It was de-recognized by the Securities and Exchange Board of India (SEBI) on 31 August 2004. Appeals by the Stock Exchange to overrule this order have been subsequently rejected on 2 November 2005 and 4 October 2006.

Robotics and Automation
Mangalore Robautonics Pvt Ltd is a company that designs, develops and manufactures Robotics and Automation systems for agricultural, industrial and consumer sectors.

Information Technology (IT) 

Major information technology (IT) and software companies like Infosys, Cognizant Technology Solutions, Endurance International Group and Thomson Reuters have their branches at Mangalore. Tata Consultancy Services (TCS) has planned to invest  and setup its office at Karnad near Mangalore.

Other multinational software companies having their presence in this coastal city include Novigo Solutions, MResult, Riskonnect (specialized in Risk management), Coresight Research (specialized in Artificial Intelligence, Analytics and Blockchain), Arkieva (specialized in Supply Chain management) and Tetherfi (specialized in Virtual Banking and Automation). Mphasis BPO has one of its branches at Mangalore. KEONICS has planned to set up an IT park in Mangalore, similar to Electronic City, spanning an area of 100 acres.

Food processing 
Campco has its chocolate manufacturing plants at Baikampady and Puttur near Mangalore. The plant produces chocolates and other products of cocoa both under its own brand and also for Nestle. Achal Industries has built its cashew processing plant at the Baikampady Industrial Estate in Mangalore. Ideal Ice Cream Factory, situated at Kottara Chowki in Mangalore, manufactures over 40 flavours of ice-creams. Mangalore also houses the edible oil refinery of Adani Wilmar.

Cruise tourism 

Various cruise ships such as Regent Seven Seas, Norwegian Star, Oceania, Celebrity, Costa, AIDA, Nautica and Royal Caribbean International have visited the New Mangalore Port. Foreigners can enter Mangalore through the New Mangalore Port with the help of Electronic visa (e-visa). Cruise ships from Europe, North America and UAE arrive at New Mangalore Port to tour the places around Mangalore.

Startups 
Government of India has planned to make Mangalore the first startup district in the country with 20 tinkering labs and incubation centres. The startups aim at providing solutions in agriculture, health, education and information technology. Centre for Entrepreneurship Opportunities and Learning (CEOL) - the first startup incubation centre of Coastal Karnataka is present at Mallikatta in Mangalore city. Government of Karnataka has planned to make Mangalore an Animation hub for the State.

Research and Development (R&D) centres 
There are 3 Research and Development (R&D) centres near Mangalore. They are
 BASF - located at Katipalla
 Central Plantation Crops Research Institute (CPCRI) - located at Vitla
 National Research Centre for Cashew (NRCC) - located at Puttur

Special Economic Zones 
The following special economic zones to be located in and around Mangalore have been approved by Board of Approval, Government Of India  & Under establishment.

Fishing 

Fish is one of the widely consumed food in Mangalore. Old Mangalore Port is the fishing port in Mangalore. The city has an ice factory on the banks of Netravati river and fish meal processing industries.

Traditional commerce and industry

Tile industry
Although the tile industry has been in decline due to the predominance of concrete in modern construction, Mangalore tiles were exported to East Asia, Europe, Australia, Africa, and the Middle East.

Arecanut industry
Arecanut industries are small-scale operations. Arecanuts are cultivated in the hilly regions towards the east of the city.

Leaf spring industry
The leaf spring industry has its presence in Mangalore, with Canara Workshops Ltd. and Lamina Suspension Products Ltd. in the city.

See also 
 Balmatta
 Falnir
 Kankanady
 Attavar
 Pandeshwar
 Bejai
 Kodialbail
 Kadri, Mangalore

References

External links